Excoriated acne  is a mild acne accompanied by extensive excoriations caused by the person picking at the pimples (that is, scratching or squeezing them).

See also 
 List of cutaneous conditions

References

External links 

Acneiform eruptions